Plainfield, New Jersey was incorporated on April 21, 1869. Mayors are sworn in on January 1 of the new year, so there are no overlaps in years unless someone has died in office or resigned.

References

 
Plainfield